Hypobathrum is a genus of flowering plants belonging to the family Rubiaceae.

Its native range is Tropical Asia.

Species:

Hypobathrum bangueyense 
Hypobathrum brevipes 
Hypobathrum caudifolium 
Hypobathrum collinum 
Hypobathrum coniferum 
Hypobathrum coniocarpum 
Hypobathrum coriaceum 
Hypobathrum ellipticifolium 
Hypobathrum frutescens 
Hypobathrum glaberrimum 
Hypobathrum glabrum 
Hypobathrum gracile 
Hypobathrum hirtum 
Hypobathrum hoaense 
Hypobathrum lancifolium 
Hypobathrum lithophilum 
Hypobathrum longifolium 
Hypobathrum microcarpum 
Hypobathrum multibracteatum 
Hypobathrum palustre 
Hypobathrum parviflorum 
Hypobathrum purpureum 
Hypobathrum purpuricarpum 
Hypobathrum racemosum 
Hypobathrum rheophyticum 
Hypobathrum riparium 
Hypobathrum rufidulum 
Hypobathrum salicinum 
Hypobathrum sampitense 
Hypobathrum subulatum 
Hypobathrum venulosum

References

Rubiaceae
Rubiaceae genera